Rauf Pasha may refer to:

 Mehmed Emin Rauf Pasha (1780–1859), Ottoman industrialist and statesman
 Mehmed Rauf Pasha (1838 – 1923), an Ottoman senator and liberal politician
 Mehmed Rauf Pasha bin Abdi Pasha (1832–1908), Ottoman soldier and statesman of Circassian origin.
 Muhammad Rauf Pasha  (c.1832–1888), Egyptian soldier and colonial administrator